Donald Allan Ashby (March 8, 1955 – May 30, 1981) was a Canadian professional ice hockey centre who played six seasons in the National Hockey League from 1975–76 until 1980–81.

Early life and career
Ashby was born in Kamloops, British Columbia, and played for the Toronto Maple Leafs, Colorado Rockies and Edmonton Oilers in his NHL career.

Personal life and career
Ashby played 188 career NHL games, scoring 40 goals, 56 assists and 96 points. He was drafted sixth overall by the Maple Leafs in the 1975 NHL Amateur Draft.

He was married to Terry until his death in 1981.

Death
On May 30, 1981, a few days after finishing the 1980–81 season which Ashby played with the CHL Wichita Wind, he and his wife, Terry, were involved in an automobile accident in the Okanagan Valley. The vehicle that they were driving was hit head-on by a pick up truck. Ashby was critically injured in the accident and died afterwards from massive internal injuries in the hospital in Kelowna, British Columbia. He was 26 years old at the time of his death in the accident. His wife, Terry, survived the accident and was treated in the hospital. His funeral was held four days later, on June 3.

Career statistics

See also
List of ice hockey players who died during their playing career
List of people who died in traffic collisions
Clayton Weishuhn

References

External links

1955 births
1981 deaths
Accidental deaths in British Columbia
Calgary Centennials players
Canadian expatriate ice hockey players in the United States
Canadian ice hockey centres
Dallas Black Hawks players
Colorado Rockies (NHL) players
Edmonton Oilers players
Fort Worth Texans players
Ice hockey people from British Columbia
Kamloops Rockets players
Michigan Stags draft picks
National Hockey League first-round draft picks
New Brunswick Hawks players
Oklahoma City Blazers (1965–1977) players
Road incident deaths in Canada
Sportspeople from Kamloops
Toronto Maple Leafs draft picks
Toronto Maple Leafs players
Wichita Wind players